The Cyprus dwarf hippopotamus or Cypriot pygmy hippopotamus (Hippopotamus minor or Phanourios minor) is an extinct species of hippopotamus that inhabited the island of Cyprus from the Pleistocene until the early Holocene.

The  Cyprus dwarf hippo was roughly the same size as the extant pygmy hippopotamus. Unlike the modern pygmy hippo, the Cyprus dwarf became small through the process of insular dwarfism. Mitochondrial DNA suggests that its closest living relative is the common hippopotamus, (Hippopotamus amphibius) with an estimated divergence between 1.36 to 1.58 million years ago.

H. minor is the smallest hippopotamus of all known insular hippopotamuses. The extremely small size of the hippo is in favour of a Middle Pleistocene or perhaps even Early Pleistocene colonization. At the time of its extinction between 11,000 and 9,000 years ago, the Cyprus dwarf hippo, along with the similarly sized Cyprus dwarf elephant, were the only large mammals native to the islands, and one of only four native terrestrial mammal species, alongside the still living Cypriot mouse and the extinct genet species Genetta plesictoides. It was a herbivore and had no natural predators.  Analysis of the carpal bones and the bones of the hindlimbs suggests that it was more terrestrial than its living relatives, and capable of moving on the rugged terrain of Cyprus.

Compared to H. amphibius, the muzzle region of the skull is much shorter, and the skull as a whole resembles that of the pygmy hippopotamus. The teeth of H. minor are more brachydont (less high crowned) than those of H. amphibius, suggesting that H. minor probably occupied a browsing niche, in contrast to the grazing predominant diet of modern Hippopotamus amphibius, though its diet is likely to have varied in correspondence to glacial cycle-induced climatic changes.

Bones of H. minor are associated with human artifacts at the Aetokremnos rockshelter on the southern coast of Cyprus, dating to approximately 12,000 years Before Present, which is suggested by some authors to provide evidence that the Cyprus dwarf hippo was encountered and driven to extinction by the early human residents of Cyprus. However, these suggestions have been contested, with an alternative proposal that bones at Aetokremnos accumulated naturally over hundreds of years, with the human occupation of the site after the bones were initially deposited.

Taxonomy

Many scientists maintain the name Phanourios minor for the Cypriot dwarf hippo. This generic name was given by Paul Sondaar and Bert Boekschoten in 1972, based on the remains from Agios Georgios, Cyprus. At the site, a chapel had been built into the fossiliferous rocks. The rock strata here are very rich in bone content (bone breccia). For centuries, as already mentioned by Bordone in the 16th century, villagers have gone there to collect these bones, which in their opinion are holy, because they are the petrified remains of Saint Fanourios (see also Phanourios (saint)), a Greek Orthodox saint who, according to local myth, had fled from Syria to escape his persecutors, but had been stranded on the hostile rocky coast of Cyprus. The collected bones are ground into a powder believed to have medicinal powers. To honour the local tradition and to refer to the site, Sondaar and Boekschoten named their new genus Phanourios, following the Greek spelling. They gave the specific name minutus, but this was later changed to minor following rules of priority. Other authors contend that the genus Hippopotamus should be maintained for the species, because it descends from other members of the Hippopotamus genus.

See also
 Cretan dwarf hippopotamus
 Maltese dwarf hippopotamus
 Sicilian dwarf hippopotamus
 Cyprus dwarf elephant

References

Extinct hippopotamuses
Mammals described in 1822
Pleistocene even-toed ungulates
Extinct mammals of Europe
Holocene extinctions
Prehistoric Cyprus
Fossil taxa described in 1822